Bathsheba (or The Toilet of Bathsheba After the Bath) are names given to a c 1480 oil on wood panel painting by the Early Netherlandish artist Hans Memling, now in the Staatsgalerie, Stuttgart. Its unusually close framing and the fact that many of the details are cut off suggests that it is a fragment of a larger, probably religious, panel or triptych that was broken up. The painting is noted for being a rare 15th century depiction of a nude person in Northern Renaissance art; such figures typically only appeared in representations of the Last Judgement, and were hardly as deliberately erotic. Memling is attributed one other secular nude portrait, in the center panel of his c. 1485 Vanitas allegory Triptych of Earthly Vanity and Divine Salvation, at the Musée des Beaux-Arts, Strasbourg. As opposed to Bathsheba, that nude is fully exposed, with visible genitalia.

Bathsheba is naked save a robe which the maid is about to wrap but hasn't quite wrapped around her. The women are indoors but before an open window which leads out to a courtyard and skyscape. The bath from which Bathsheba emerges is pillared, with a roof of cushioned black velvet. There is a small white dog by her right foot. In the background, King David and a boy can be seen standing on the balcony high above.

The maid's facial type, demeanour and clothing bear the strong influence of Rogier van der Weyden's depictions of the Virgin Mary. The figure of Bathsheba has been compared to that in Jan van Eyck's now lost Woman Bathing, although that painting is more allegorical than narrative.

Notes

Sources

 Exum, Cheryl. Cultural Representations of Biblical Women. 
 Panofsky, Erwin. Early Netherlandish Painting. London: Harper Collins, 1953. 
 Ridderbos, Bernhard; Van Buren, Anne; Van Veen, Henk. Early Netherlandish Paintings: Rediscovery, Reception and Research. Amsterdam: Amsterdam University Press, 2005. 
 De Vos, Dirk. Hans Memling: The Complete Works. Ghent: Harry N Abrams, 1994. 

1470s paintings
Paintings by Hans Memling
Paintings depicting Bathsheba
Dogs in art